The Bulgaria women's national cricket team represents the country of Bulgaria in international Women's cricket. The team is organised by the Bulgarian Cricket Federation, which became an affiliate member of the International Cricket Council (ICC) in 2008.

In April 2018, the ICC granted full Women's Twenty20 International (WT20I) status to all its members. Therefore, all Twenty20 matches played between Bulgaria women and other ICC members after 1 July 2018 will be a full WT20I.

History
The game of cricket was introduced into Bulgaria in the early 20th century by English diplomats and was played in the American college in the centre of Southwest Bulgaria – Blagoevgrad.
The new history of Bulgarian cricket began in 2002 with the official foundation of the Bulgarian Cricket Federation with the efforts of a few enthusiastic sportsmen, captivated by the game. At the same meeting members appointed prof. Nikolay Kolev as a president of the federation.
Based at Bulgaria's National Sports Agency in the capital city of Sofia, the BCF has ten member clubs with juniors, seniors and universities male and female teams, which compete in an annual league and other national and regional tournaments.

See also
 Bulgaria national cricket team

References

External links 
 Official Site
 Cricinfo Bulgaria

Cricket in Bulgaria
Women's national cricket teams
Cricket
Bulgaria in international cricket